William Roscoe Mercer (1927–2000), better known to millions of radio listeners simply as Rosko, was an American announcer, commercial voice over specialist and disc jockey (DJ).  He is best known for his stints on New York's WOR-FM and WNEW-FM in the late 1960s and 1970s. He was often a rare African-American voice on radio stations that primarily broadcast to white audiences.

His first job for a large media market radio station came in 1965, when he was a DJ on KBLA 1500 AM in Burbank, California. Later, Rosko and other DJs of the time pioneered the Progressive Rock format on FM stations, in response to the restrictive playlist programming of Top 40 AM stations.  

In the early 1980s, he joined 92.3 WKTU in New York during its disco music era, for an evening program.  He started and ended each show with the greeting "This is Rosko.  I sure do love you so."

Mercer died of cancer on August 1, 2000.

References

External links
 Rosko's Obituary in The New York Times
 One-hour aircheck purportedly from WNEW-FM, December 1970 (Airchexx.com)

1927 births
2000 deaths
Radio personalities from New York City